Two ships of the Royal Navy have borne the name HMS Olympus:

 was an  launched in 1928 and sunk in 1942.
 was an  launched in 1961. She was decommissioned in 1989 and transferred to the Royal Canadian Navy as a training ship. She was put up for disposal in 2002.

See also

Royal Navy ship names